Mello Yello 200 may refer to:

Mello Yello 200 (Hickory), a Budweiser Late Model Sportsman Series race run at Hickory Motor Speedway in March 1983
Mello Yello 200 (Rougemont), a 1983 NASCAR Budweiser Late Model Sportsman Series race run at Orange County Speedway in July 1983

See also
Mello Yello 300, 1980–1984
Mello Yello 500, 1990–1994